The rufous-breasted bush robin (Tarsiger hyperythrus) is a species of bird in the family Muscicapidae.
It is found in Bangladesh, Bhutan, southwestern China, northeast India, northern Myanmar and Nepal.
Its natural habitat is temperate forests.

References

rufous-breasted bush robin
Birds of Eastern Himalaya
Birds of Yunnan
rufous-breasted bush robin
rufous-breasted bush robin
Taxonomy articles created by Polbot